Lauren Stein McLean (born October 20, 1974) is an American politician and entrepreneur serving as the mayor of Boise, Idaho. McLean served as a member of the Boise City Council from 2011 to 2019, and as council president from 2017 to 2019, before defeating four term incumbent Mayor Dave Bieter in the 2019 mayoral election.

Early life and education 
McLean was born in Boston, Massachusetts, and raised in Houston, Texas, and Cazenovia, New York. McLean received her Bachelor of Arts degree from the University of Notre Dame in 1997 and a Master of Public Administration in environmental policy from Boise State University in 2001.

Career 
McLean serves on the board of governors of the Andrus Center for Public Policy at Boise State University. She is also a member of the Boise City Planning and Zoning Association and Boise Parks Commission.

Mayor

2019 election 
McLean was a candidate in the 2019 Boise mayoral election, running against incumbent Dave Bieter, former mayor H. Brent Coles, and others. Since neither Bieter nor McLean had surpassed the 50 percent vote threshold required to claim victory, the two competed in a runoff election held on December 3, 2019. McLean won with 65.5 percent of the vote to Bieter's 34.5 percent. The mayor's office is a nonpartisan position, though McLean is a registered Democrat.

McLean is the first woman elected to the office, and the second to serve as Boise mayor after Carolyn Terteling-Payne, who served briefly on an interim basis from 2003 to 2004. McLean was inaugurated on January 7, 2020.

Tenure 
On July 1, 2020, McLean presided over the swearing-in of Boise's new police chief, Ryan Lee, who had been confirmed to the position by the Boise City Council. The ceremony took place the day following a Boise Black Lives Matter rally. McLean does not support defunding the police to divert funds to social services. In response to a question about her position, she stated that "We have to have a safe city if we’re going to have a city where everyone can thrive. I’m in full support of our police department." McLean has stated that she supports increasing funding for social services while maintaining funding for the police department.

McLean announced in March 2020 that April rents in city-owned public housing would be forgiven, and that during the same period the city would place a moratorium on evictions from public rental housing.

In November 2020, in response to rising numbers of COVID-19 cases and occupied hospital beds, McLean issued a mask mandate and closed public facilities. In response to the mask mandate, there were protests outside McLean's residence, in addition to a mask-burning ceremony. The city of Boise announced in January 2021 that public facilities would expand services beginning on February 1, 2021. McLean noted that "We have seen a steady hold in cases the last couple weeks and our city is here to serve the public."
 
McLean announced Idaho's votes in the roll call at the 2020 Democratic National Convention where she also promoted the city's efforts to combat global warming.

Personal life 
McLean and her husband Scott have two children.

Electoral history

See also

List of mayors of Boise, Idaho

References 

Living people
1974 births
21st-century American politicians
21st-century American women politicians
Boise State University alumni
Idaho Democrats
Mayors of Boise, Idaho
Politicians from Boston
Women mayors of places in Idaho
University of Notre Dame alumni
People from Houston
People from Cazenovia, New York